was a scion of the Japanese imperial family and was a career naval officer who served as chief of staff of the Imperial Japanese Navy from 1932 to 1941.

Early life
Prince Hiroyasu was born in Tokyo as Prince Narukata, the eldest son of Prince Fushimi Sadanaru (1858–1923) by one of his concubines. He was the twenty-third head of the Fushimi-no-miya, one of the four shinnōke cadet branches of the imperial family entitled to succeed to the throne in default of a direct heir. Prince Fushimi was a second cousin to both Emperor Shōwa (Hirohito) and Empress Kōjun, and nephew of Prince Kan'in Kotohito

He succeeded to title Kachō-no-miya on April 23, 1883, upon which he changed his name from "Narukata" to "Hiroyasu," but returned to the house of Fushimi-no-miya on January 16, 1904.

Marriage & family
On January 9, 1896, Prince Hiroyasu married Tokugawa Tsuneko (1882–1939), the ninth daughter of Prince Tokugawa Yoshinobu, Japan's last shōgun, with whom he had six children: 
 
 ; Married Marquis Asano Nagatake
 ; Became Prince Kachō Hirotada
 ; Became Marquis Kachō Hironobu: took peerage title of Marquis and succeeded to head of Kachō-no-miya household
 ; Married Count Kiyosu Yukiyasu.
 ; married Prince Kuni Asaakira.
 ; Became Count Fushimi Hirohide: took peerage title of Count, served in IJN, KIA.

Military career
Prince Hiroyasu entered the Imperial Japanese Naval Academy on 5 April 1886, but resigned in September 1889 and moved to Germany. He enrolled in the Naval Academy of the Kaiserliche Marine on 8 April 1892. Promoted to midshipman (Fähnrich zur See) on March 30, 1893 and to ensign (Oberfähnrich zur See) on April 20, 1894, he graduated from the academy on 15 August 1895 and returned to service in the IJN. He spoke fluent German. He then served aboard the cruisers Itsukushima and Matsushima. On December 1, 1897, he was promoted to sub-lieutenant and assigned to the battleship Fuji, receiving a promotion to lieutenant on December 27. Promoted to lieutenant-commander on July 29, 1903, he served in the Russo-Japanese War (1904–05), and sustained wounds aboard the battleship Mikasa in the Battle of the Yellow Sea (August 1904). He later served as executive officer on the cruiser Niitaka, battleship Okinoshima, and cruisers Naniwa and Nisshin. He was awarded the Order of the Golden Kite, 4th class, for his services in the Russo-Japanese War, and was promoted to commander on September 28, 1906.

He studied in Great Britain from 1907 to 1910 and upon his return to Japan was promoted to captain on December 1, 1910. He commanded the cruiser Takachiho (1910), and later the Asahi and the battlecruiser Ibuki. Promoted to rear admiral on August 31, 1913, he rose to vice admiral on December 1, 1916 and to full admiral on December 1, 1922. He was a member of the Supreme War Council from 1920 onward. He was a strong supporter of the Fleet Faction within the Navy, pushing for cancellation of the Washington Naval Agreement and the building of a more powerful navy.

Prince Hiroyasu succeeded his father as the twenty-third head of the house of Fushimi in 1923. He was appointed commander of the Sasebo Naval District in 1924. Admiral Prince Fushimi became the chief of the Imperial Japanese Navy General Staff on February 2, 1932, replacing Admiral Abo Kiyokazu, and held the post to April 9, 1941.

Prince Fushimi received the largely honorary rank of marshal admiral on May 27, 1932, and the Collar of the Supreme Order of the Chrysanthemum in 1934.

While he was Chief of Staff of the Imperial Japanese Navy, the Imperial Japanese Navy Air Service used strategic bombing against Chinese cities including Shanghai and Chongqing. The bombing of Nanjing and Guangzhou, which began on September 22–23, 1937, resulted in widespread international condemnation of Japan and a resolution against Japan by the Far Eastern Advisory Committee of the League of Nations.

As Chief of Staff, he supported the "southward advance" into northern French Indochina and the Dutch East Indies, but expressed reservations about the Tripartite Pact during the September 19, 1940, Imperial Conference.

Hiroyasu Fushimi was awarded the Order of the Golden Kite, 1st class, in 1942. He remained a member of the Supreme War Council throughout the Pacific War, but officially retired from the active list in 1945.

After the war, Fushimi was the honorary president of the Imperial Life Boat Association, the Japan Seamen's Relief Association, the Cancer Research Society, the Naval Club, the Japan-German Society, and the Scientific and Chemical Research Institute.

Like all members of the Imperial family involved in the conduct of the war, Prince Fushimi was exonerated from criminal prosecutions before the Tokyo tribunal by Douglas MacArthur. He died in Tokyo shortly after the end of World War II on August 16, 1946.

Honours 
He received the following orders and decorations:

Gallery

References

Notes

Books

External links

1875 births
1946 deaths
People from Tokyo
Japanese princes
Kachō-no-miya
Fushimi-no-miya
Imperial Japanese Navy marshal admirals
Japanese military personnel of the Russo-Japanese War
Japanese people of World War I
People of Meiji-period Japan
Japanese admirals of World War II
Recipients of the Order of the Golden Kite
Grand Crosses of the Order of Saint Stephen of Hungary
Grand Croix of the Légion d'honneur
Recipients of the Order of the Netherlands Lion
Honorary Knights Grand Cross of the Royal Victorian Order